The Malampaya gas field or the Malampaya-Camago field is a deepwater gas-condensate reservoir, located in the Service Contract 38 license area, located offshore, 65 km northwest of the island of Palawan, Philippines.

Background

The field was discovered during the drilling of the Camago-1 well in 1989, and following successful appraisal of the Malampaya field in the 1990s, first gas flowed in September 2001. Commercial production started in January 2002. The field was developed and currently operated by Shell Philippines Exploration B.V. (SPEX), under the Royal Dutch Shell; with joint venture partners - Chevron Malampaya LLC and Philippine National Oil Company Exploration Corporation. On November 13, 2019, the Dennis Uy-led Udenna Corp. acquired Chevron Philippines Ltd.’s 45% stake. The Senate raised "red flags" about the company's expertise and financial capability to operate the gas field.

The Malampaya Phase 1 development included five production wells, tied back via flowlines to the Shallow Water Platform. Gas is exported through a 504-km subsea Gas Export Pipeline that delivers to the Onshore Gas Plant in Batangas City on Luzon Island to the northeast, for final treatment and metering.

Shell successfully completed Malampaya Phase 2 in 2013, which added two new production wells. Malampaya Phase 3 saw the design, fabrication and installation of a new depletion compression platform to maintain levels of gas production, which began operating in October 2015. This was the first oil and gas platform to be designed and built in the Philippines, and its successful completion has made the country a player in construction for the oil and gas industry.

The upstream component of the US$4.5 billion Malampaya gas-to-power project was expected to provide substantial long-term revenue of between $8 billion–$10 billion  to the Philippine government over its lifespan. As of 2018, the project has already surpassed US$10 billion in government revenues. Malampaya’s main benefits to the Philippines include reducing oil imports, assuring a more stable supply of energy and a cleaner source of power, and meeting up to about 40% of Luzon's energy requirements.

Key Facts 
Location: Offshore Palawan, Philippines

Depth: Wells are in 820 metres (2,690 feet) of water depth and the reservoir is 2,990 metres below sea level

Interests: Shell Philippines Exploration B.V. 45% (Shell-operated), Chevron 45%, Philippine National Oil Company-Exploration Corporation (government) 10%

Key contractors: Malampaya is a joint undertaking of the Philippine national government and the private sector. The project is spearheaded by the Philippine Department of Energy (DOE) and developed and operated by Shell Philippines Exploration B.V. (SPEX) on behalf of joint venture partners Chevron Malampaya LLC and the Philippine National Oil Corporation-Exploration Corporation

Fields: Camago-Malampaya gas reservoir

Production (100%): 
 about  gas production at standard conditions 

Malampaya fund scam 
The Malampaya Fund is the name given to a government fund comprising profits from the Malampaya Deep Water Gas-to-Power project. It was created to support energy resource development and exploration programs, with the President of the Philippines given the prerogative to determine other uses for the profits.

In 2009, President Gloria Macapagal Arroyo authorized then-Budget Secretary Rolando Andaya Jr. to release ₱900 million from the fund to aid victims of Tropical Storm Ondoy and Typhoon Pepeng. The amount did not go to the communities affected by the disasters, but was allegedly plundered after being released to nongovernmental organizations linked to Janet Lim Napoles.

Andaya and Napoles were subsequently charged for allegedly violating the Anti-Graft and Corrupt Practices Act.

See also
 Philippines and the Spratly Islands
 Malampaya Sound Protected Landscape and Seascape
 West Philippine Sea
 Pandacan oil depot

References

External links
 Official website of project
 A map can be found here
 Project page on Shell's official website
 Page on the project from Offshore Technology, an industry news website
 A PDF from the Philippine Department of Energy with history timeline
 PNOC Exploration Corporation Official Website
 

Natural gas fields in the Philippines
Geography of Palawan